Scott West (born 14 November 1974) is a former Australian rules footballer who represented the  in the Australian Football League (AFL). Having won a club-record seven Charlie Sutton Medals, West is recognised as one of the Bulldogs' greatest-ever players. A tough "in-and-under" midfielder who was hard at the ball, especially around the stoppages, West was regularly among the league's most prolific ballwinners during his playing career.

Early career 
One of three brothers, West grew up in the northwestern Melbourne suburb of Keilor a keen  supporter. Ironically, his childhood neighbour and future Essendon footballer Rick Olarenshaw was a Footscray supporter. His older brother Troy initially trained at Essendon until told the West family residence actually belonged to Footscray's recruiting zone. Troy would go on to have a fine career with Williamstown Football Club. The third brother, Brent, is Scott's twin.

West was educated at Penleigh and Essendon Grammar School (PEGS), whom he represented in football with the Associated Grammar Schools of Victoria (AGSV) First XVIII in 1991 and 1992 along with Shane Crawford and future teammate Paul Dimattina. He won an AFL Rising Star nomination that season. In 1993 and 1994 he wore the number 14 guernsey, before changing to his famous number 7 in the wake of Doug Hawkins' departure to Fitzroy in 1995.

AFL career 
After Footscray rebranded itself the Western Bulldogs during the tumultuous 1996 season, the Bulldogs rebounded dramatically in 1997, falling agonizingly short of their first Grand Final appearance since 1961 when the eventual premiers  came from behind to win the Preliminary Final by two points. West's contribution in the club's amazing turnaround was recognized when he won the second of what would be seven Charlie Sutton Medals. He made All-Australian selection on five occasions – in 1998, 2000, 2004, 2005 and 2006. West's best and fairest victory in 2005 saw him overtake Gary Dempsey's previous record of six.

Late in 2006 West had been described as being in the best form of his career despite him being 32 years of age and completing his 300th game. This run of form included an incredible career best 45 disposals in one match against the Adelaide Crows. In the 2006 season, West became the first player on record (recorded since 1987) to amass more than 400 handpasses in a season, finishing with 423.

West finished runner-up in the Brownlow Medal count twice: in 2000 and in 2006. He also finished third in the 1999 count, making him one of the best footballers never to have won the AFL's most prestigious individual honour. In 2000 he was particularly unlucky: going into the final round, he was level with Shane Woewodin from Melbourne on 22 votes. Having had only 17 disposals and being interchanged for majority of the final quarter, Woewodin wasn't considered a chance to poll
against West Coast, however Woewodin polled 2 votes and consequently
Won the medal on 24 votes. Wests amazing brownlow record consists of  third in 1999, second (by two votes) in 2000 and (by two votes) in 2006 and fourth in 2004 and 2005. In 2006 he won the Sunday Footy Show's Lou Richards award for best player as voted by Channel 9's football commentators. He was the crowd favourite to win the Brownlow Medal in 2006, due to his string of close misses and secondly, because he was one of the few Victoria-based players with a high chance of winning the award, during a period when non-Victorian teams were dominating the league. West ended up finishing second in 2006 behind Adam Goodes.

On 23 September 2008, his career came to an end after the Bulldogs said he was no longer required at the club.

Post-playing career
West is a qualified landscape gardener and has run a landscaping business since 1997.

In 2012 he became the coach of the Werribee Football Club in the Victorian Football League (VFL). His stint was short but reasonably successful, leading Werribee to consecutive Preliminary Finals before quitting after the 2013 season in the hope of landing a coaching role in the AFL.

In October 2014, West was among the candidates considered to replace Brendan McCartney as senior coach of the Bulldogs, but the position eventually was given to Luke Beveridge.

West has also been working as a football commentator on radio for the Australian Broadcasting Commission (ABC).

Honours
In early 2002, West was named in the Western Bulldogs Team of the Century.

The Scott West Award, awarded to the Western Bulldogs' most courageous player during a season, was named in his honour.

In 2013 West was inducted into the Australian Football Hall of Fame.

In March 2017, West was chosen as one of the club icons to unfurl the Bulldogs' premiership flag.

Career Statistics

|-
|- style="background-color: #EAEAEA"
! scope="row" style="text-align:center" | 1993
|style="text-align:center;"|
| 14 || 17 || 21 || 15 || 170 || 119 || 289 || 36 || 35 || 1.2 || 0.9 || 10.0 || 7.0 || 17.0 || 2.1 || 2.1 || 8
|-
! scope="row" style="text-align:center" | 1994
|style="text-align:center;"|
| 14 || 23 || 9 || 11 || 338 || 155 || 493 || 51 || 38 || 0.4 || 0.5 || 14.7 || 6.7 || 21.4 || 2.2 || 1.7 || 2
|- style="background-color: #EAEAEA"
! scope="row" style="text-align:center" | 1995
|style="text-align:center;"|
| 7 || 23|| 6 || 13 || 365 || 182 || 547 || 46 || 45 || 0.3 || 0.6 || 15.9 || 7.9 || 23.8 || 2.0 || 2.0 || 9
|-
! scope="row" style="text-align:center" | 1996
|style="text-align:center;"|
| 7 || 15 || 0 || 4 || 137 || 128 || 265 || 21 || 23 || 0.0 || 0.3 || 9.1 || 8.5 || 17.7 || 1.4 || 1.5 || 1
|- style="background-color: #EAEAEA"
! scope="row" style="text-align:center" | 1997
|style="text-align:center;"|
| 7 || 24 || 5 || 3 || 367 || 240 || 607 || 58 || 57 || 0.2 || 0.1 || 15.3 || 10.0 || 25.3 || 2.4 || 2.4 || 5
|-
! scope="row" style="text-align:center" | 1998
|style="text-align:center;"|
| 7 || 24 || 5 || 3 || 309 || bgcolor=CAE1FF | 301† || 610 || 40 || 67 || 0.2 || 0.1 || 12.9 || bgcolor=CAE1FF | 12.5† || 25.4 || 1.7 || 2.8 || 23
|- style="background-color: #EAEAEA"
! scope="row" style="text-align:center" | 1999
|style="text-align:center;"|
| 7 || 21 || 11 || 5 || 244 || 268 || 512 || 47 || 40 || 0.5 || 0.2 || 11.6 || 12.8 || 24.4 || 2.2 || 1.9 || 14
|-
! scope="row" style="text-align:center" | 2000
|style="text-align:center;"|
| 7 || 23 || 7 || 5 || 331 || bgcolor=CAE1FF | 326† || 657 || 80 || 51 || 0.3 || 0.2 || 14.4 || bgcolor=CAE1FF | 14.2† || 28.6 || 3.5 || 2.2 || 22
|- style="background-color: #EAEAEA"
! scope="row" style="text-align:center" | 2001
|style="text-align:center;"|
| 7 || 22 || 11 || 4 || 283 || 298 || 581 || 72 || 59 || 0.5 || 0.2 || 12.9 || bgcolor=CAE1FF | 13.5† || 26.4 || 3.3 || 2.7 || 8
|-
! scope="row" style="text-align:center" | 2002
|style="text-align:center;"|
| 7 || 18 || 8 || 8 || 222 || 249 || 471 || 61 || 57 || 0.4 || 0.4 || 12.3 || bgcolor=CAE1FF | 13.8† || bgcolor=CAE1FF | 26.2† || 3.4 || 3.2 || 8
|- style="background-color: #EAEAEA"
! scope="row" style="text-align:center" | 2003
|style="text-align:center;"|
| 7 || 22 || 3 || 6 || 277 || bgcolor=CAE1FF | 343† || 620 || 107 || 67 || 0.1 || 0.3 || 12.6 || bgcolor=CAE1FF | 15.6† || bgcolor=CAE1FF | 28.2† || 4.9 || 3.0 || 4
|-
! scope="row" style="text-align:center" | 2004
|style="text-align:center;"|
| 7 || 22 || 7 || 10 || 278 || 314 || 592 || 104 || 80 || 0.3 || 0.5 || 12.6 || 14.3 || bgcolor=CAE1FF | 26.9† || 4.7 || 3.6 || 20
|- style="background-color: #EAEAEA"
! scope="row" style="text-align:center" | 2005
|style="text-align:center;"|
| 7 || 22 || 4 || 7 || 267 || 370 || bgcolor=CAE1FF | 637† || 91 || 61 || 0.2 || 0.3 || 12.1 || 16.8 || bgcolor=CAE1FF | 29.0† || 4.1 || 2.8 || 17
|-
! scope="row" style="text-align:center" | 2006
|style="text-align:center;"|
| 7 || 24 || 6 || 5 || 285 || bgcolor=CAE1FF | 423† || bgcolor=CAE1FF | 708† || 119 || 77 || 0.3 || 0.2 || 11.9 || bgcolor=CAE1FF | 17.6§ || bgcolor=CAE1FF | 29.5† || 5.0 || 3.2 || 23
|- style="background-color: #EAEAEA"
! scope="row" style="text-align:center" | 2007
|style="text-align:center;"|
| 7 || 20 || 1 || 6 || 211 || 329 || 540 || 110 || 82 || 0.1 || 0.3 || 10.6 || bgcolor=CAE1FF | 16.5† || 27.0 || 5.5 || 4.1 || 8
|-
! scope="row" style="text-align:center" | 2008
|style="text-align:center;"|
| 7 || 4 || 0 || 0 || 45 || 48 || 93 || 14 || 14 || 0.0 || 0.0 || 11.3 || 12.0 || 23.3 || 3.5 || 3.5 || 3
|- class="sortbottom"
! colspan=3| Career
! 324
! 104
! 105
! 4129
! 4093
! 8222
! 1057
! 853
! 0.3
! 0.3
! 12.7
! 12.6
! 25.4
! 3.3
! 2.6
! 175
|}

Other
West has made several appearances on the AFL Footy Show and appeared on a pizza ad with Melbourne's David Neitz.

West was married to Leshelle and has four sons: Rhylee (born 2000), Kobi, Cooper and Levi (born 2008).West married Linda on 23/11/19. Rhylee was drafted by the Western Bulldogs in 2018 as a father-son selection.

References

External links 

 
 
 

1974 births
Western Bulldogs players
All-Australians (AFL)
Charles Sutton Medal winners
Living people
Australian rules footballers from South Australia
Australian rules footballers from Melbourne
Victorian State of Origin players
Strathmore Football Club players
Werribee Football Club coaches
Australian Football Hall of Fame inductees
Australia international rules football team players
People educated at Penleigh and Essendon Grammar School
People from Keilor, Victoria
Twin sportspeople
Australian twins